Ryan LaCasse (born February 6, 1983) is a former American football linebacker for the Indianapolis Colts, primarily as a special teams player. He was drafted in the 7th round in 2006 NFL draft by the Baltimore Ravens but was traded to the Indianapolis Colts. He played for the Colts on their Super Bowl XLI championship team that beat the Chicago Bears.

Early life
He started playing football in high school at Stoughton High School in Stoughton, Massachusetts.

College career
Started 15 of 46 career contests…ranked 10th in school history with 16.5 career sacks (93 yards)…had 118 tackles, 73 solo, 23.5 tackles for losses, 17 pressures, eight FR, one FF, one interception and two passes defensed…as senior was on Super Sleeper Team by the 2006 NFL Draft Report…earned first-team All-Big East honors…started eleven games at RDE…topped club and ranked sixth in conference with nine sacks…had 12 tackles for losses, the 10th-highest seasonal total in school history…had three FF, seven pressures, one pass defensed and one interception…had career-high three sacks and three tackles for losses against Buffalo…played in 12 games as junior at DE and on special teams…had 32 tackles, 22 solo, five sacks, seven tackles for losses, six pressures and four FF…played in every game as sophomore, seeing main action on special teams…had 15 tackles, seven solo, one pressure and one pass defensed…played in eleven games after redshirt freshman season…started four games at rush-end against North Carolina, Rhode Island, Auburn and Pittsburgh…had 19 tackles, 14 solo, 2.5 sacks, 4.5 tackles for losses, three pressures, one FR and one FF…had four tackles, one sack and one FF in first career start against North Carolina.

LaCasse wore #94 as a member of the Orange.

Professional career
When the Colts won the Super Bowl, Lacasse was one of 5 Syracuse Orange alums who earned rings. The others were DE Dwight Freeney, WR Marvin Harrison, RB James Mungro (although he was on the injured list), and DT Josh Thomas.

He is currently a graduate assistant coach for the Syracuse football team.

References 

1983 births
Living people
Sportspeople from Brooklyn
Players of American football from New York City
American football linebackers
Syracuse Orange football players
Baltimore Ravens players
Indianapolis Colts players
Players of American football from Massachusetts
People from Stoughton, Massachusetts